Earl D. Morton (November 28, 1918 – October 23, 1995) was a member of the Wisconsin State Senate, from the 22nd District.

Biography
Morton was born Earl David Morton on November 28, 1918, in Kenosha, Wisconsin. He attended Carroll University and Marquette University Law School. During World War II, he served in the United States Army.

Political career
Morton was a member of the Kenosha City Council from 1955 to 1957. He was a member of the Assembly from 1957 to 1960. Morton was a member of the Republican Party. Morton served in the Wisconsin Senate from 1961 to 1965. In 1965, he was appointed a Wisconsin County judge (later Wisconsin Circuit Court judge) for Kenosha County, Wisconsin and served until his retirement in 1984. He died on October 23, 1995, in Rochester, Minnesota.

References

See also
The Political Graveyard

Politicians from Kenosha, Wisconsin
Wisconsin city council members
Republican Party Wisconsin state senators
Republican Party members of the Wisconsin State Assembly
Wisconsin state court judges
Military personnel from Wisconsin
United States Army soldiers
United States Army personnel of World War II
Carroll University alumni
Marquette University Law School alumni
1918 births
1995 deaths
20th-century American lawyers
20th-century American judges
20th-century American politicians